Dame Elizabeth Posthuma Simcoe (22 September 1762 – 17 January 1850) was an English artist and diarist in colonial Canada. Her husband, John Graves Simcoe, was the first Lieutenant Governor of Upper Canada. Her diary gives an effective account of Canadian life.

Biography
She was born Elizabeth Posthuma Gwillim to Lt Col. Thomas Gwillim and Elizabeth Spinckes in the village of Aldwincle, Northamptonshire, England, Her father died before her birth and her mother shortly afterwards. After her baptism, on the same day as her mother's burial, she was taken into the care of her mother's younger sister, Margaret. In commemoration of her posthumous birth, Elizabeth was given the middle name Posthuma. Her adopted mother, Margaret, married Admiral Samuel Graves on 14 June 1769 and she grew up at Graves's estate, Hembury Fort near Honiton in Devon. Gwillim was one of a group of friends that included Mary Anne Burges in Honiton.

On 30 December 1782, Elizabeth married John Graves Simcoe, Admiral Graves's godson. Between the years 1784 and 1804, they had eleven children, among them Francis Simcoe, after whom they named Castle Frank. Nine survived to adulthood; Katherine, their only child to be born in Upper Canada, and John Cornwall Simcoe died in infancy. Katherine is buried at Fort York Garrison. 

Elizabeth was a wealthy heiress, who acquired a 5,000-acre (2025 ha) estate near Honiton, Devon, and built Wolford Lodge, which remained the Simcoe family seat until 1923. She is buried at Wolford Chapel.

Legacy

Elizabeth Simcoe's diary provides a valuable impression of life in colonial Ontario. First published in 1911, there was a subsequent transcription published in 1965 and a paperback version at the turn of the 21st century, over 200 years after she wrote it. She also left a series of 595 watercolours that depict the town of York, Upper Canada. She proposed the naming of Scarborough Township, an eastern Toronto district, after Scarborough, North Yorkshire. The townships of North, East and West Gwillimbury, just south of Lake Simcoe, Ontario, are also named after her family. The Township of Whitchurch, today the town of Whitchurch–Stouffville, Ontario, honours her place of birth.

In December 2007, a statue of Elizabeth Gwillim Simcoe was raised in the town of Bradford West Gwillimbury, when it commemorated the 150th anniversary of its incorporation. The statue stands in a small park in front of the Bradford post office, at the corner of John Street West and Barrie Street.

References

Travels With Elizabeth Simcoe. Archives of Ontario.

External links

Travels with Elizabeth Simcoe: A Visual Journey Through Upper and Lower Canada, online exhibit on Archives of Ontario website
Simcoe family fonds, Archives of Ontario

1762 births
1850 deaths
People from Aldwincle
Scarborough, Toronto
Pre-Confederation Ontario people
Canadian diarists
Canadian women painters
English watercolourists
Women watercolorists
18th-century Canadian artists
18th-century Canadian non-fiction writers
18th-century Canadian women artists
18th-century Canadian women writers
Canadian women non-fiction writers
Women diarists